{{DISPLAYTITLE:C15H12O4}}

The chemical formula C15H12O4 (molar mass : 256.25 g/mol, exact mass 256.073559 u) may refer to:
 Hydrangeic acid, a stilbenoid
 Hydrangenol, an isocoumarin
 Isoliquiritigenin, a chalcone
 Liquiritigenin, a flavanone
 Pinocembrin, a flavanone
 Monobenzyl phthalate